The Argentina mixed national 3x3 team is a national basketball team of Argentina, governed by the Confederación Argentina de Basquetbol.
It represents the country in international 3x3 (3 against 3) mixed men's and women's basketball competitions.

See also
Argentina men's national 3x3 team
Argentina women's national 3x3 team

References

mixed
Mixed national 3x3 basketball teams